Sir Peter James Bottomley (born 30 July 1944) is a British Conservative Party politician who has served as a Member of Parliament (MP) since 1975 when elected for Woolwich West, serving until it was abolished before the 1983 general election. He has represented the Worthing West constituency since its establishment in 1997.

Following the 2019 general election, Bottomley was the longest-serving MP and therefore ”Father of the House”.

Early life
Bottomley was born in Newport, Shropshire, the son of Sir James Bottomley, a wartime army officer who later joined the Foreign and Commonwealth Office, and of Barbara, née Vardon, a social worker.  He was baptised at St Swithun's Parish Church at Cheswardine in Shropshire, where his parents had married.  After seven school changes before the age of 11, he was educated at a junior high school in Washington, D.C., and then Westminster School before studying economics at Trinity College, Cambridge, following his father, grandfather, father-in-law and father-in-law's father to the college. His supervisor was James Mirrlees, who later gained the Nobel Prize for Economics.

Before university he worked around Australia, including three weeks teaching at Geelong Grammar School deputising for the explorer and teacher John Béchervaise, and unloading trucks in Melbourne docks. In between, he spent a week walking in Mount Field National Park with Tenzing Norgay. After university, he became a lorry driver and joined the Transport and General Workers Union, before moving on to industrial sales and industrial relations. In the early 1970s, he co-founded the Neighbourhood Council in South Lambeth, resulting in the creation of football pitches and other facilities at Larkhall Park. His last job before entering Parliament was putting lights outside theatres and cinemas in London's West End. Bottomley joined the Conservative Party in 1972, at the age of 28.

Member of Parliament

On the backbenches
Bottomley contested the Vauxhall constituency in the 1973 GLC election and Woolwich West parliamentary seat in the February and October general elections of 1974, failing to defeat the sitting Labour MP William Hamling. Hamling died on 20 March 1975, and in the space of 18 months, Bottomley faced the electors of Woolwich West for a third time at the by-election on 26 June 1975.  He was elected the Conservative MP for Woolwich West with a majority of 2,382, holding this seat and its successor, Eltham, in Parliament for the next 22 years.

In 1978 he became the President of the Conservative Trade Unionists for two years. Before the 1979 general election, Bottomley became a trustee with Christian Aid in 1978 until 1984. In 1978 as a member of the Parliamentary Human Rights Group, he campaigned to prevent the anticipated assassination of Archbishop Óscar Romero and represented the British Council of Churches at the Saint’s funeral in El Salvador in 1980 when 14 people died around him. In 1979, days before the fall of the Labour Government, he made a visit to Washington, D.C., to indicate that Margaret Thatcher, if she became Prime Minister, would not lift sanctions on Southern Rhodesia nor recognise the government of Bishop Abel Muzorewa. He was for some years a member of the Conservative Monday Club as well as a member of the Bow Group and Tory Reform Group.

He has been chairman of the Church of England's Children's Society, a trustee of Mind and of Nacro and on the policy committee of One Parent Families. He served with John Sentamu on the successor committee to the Archbishop of Canterbury's commission that produced the report Faith in the City, and chaired the churches' review group on the Churches Main Committee. He is a member of the Ecclesiastical Committee and has been appointed the Parliamentary Warden at St Margaret's Church, Westminster. He has led the United Kingdom delegation to the Parliamentary Assembly of the Organization for Security and Co-operation in Europe (OSCE). He is an Hon. Vice President of WATCH, Women and the Church, supporting full equal acceptance of females.

In 1982, he became the Parliamentary Private Secretary (PPS) to the Minister of State at the Foreign and Commonwealth Office, Cranley Onslow. Peter Bottomley's seat of Woolwich West had minor boundary changes and a name change during 1982. Bottomley fought the new constituency of Eltham at the 1983 general election, winning the seat with a majority of more than 7,500 votes. Following the election, Peter Bottomley became the PPS to the Secretary of State at the Department of Health and Social Security, Norman Fowler.

Member of the Thatcher Government
After nine years on the backbenches, Bottomley became a member of Margaret Thatcher's government when he was appointed as the Parliamentary Under Secretary of State at the Department for Employment in 1984, moving sideways to the Department of Transport in 1986 to become the Minister of Roads and Traffic. In 1989 he moved sideways again to the Northern Ireland Office. He was dropped by Thatcher in 1990, when he briefly became PPS to the Secretary of State for Northern Ireland, Peter Brooke. He has been a captain of the Parliamentary football team, participated in the parliamentary swimming competition and organised the annual dinghy sailing against the House of Lords. He was captain of the Commons eight, winning the first Thames rowing race in gigs against the Lords in 2007.

Return to the backbenches
Since 1990 he has been a backbencher, described as a maverick, "supporting a range of seemingly perverse causes". Bottomley decided not to re-contest Eltham after major boundary changes, but sought nomination elsewhere. Following the retirement of the Conservative MP for Worthing Terence Higgins, Bottomley contested the newly formed constituency of Worthing West at the 1997 general election, gaining the seat with a majority of 7,713.

In 2009, Bottomley was the vice-chairman of the All Party Parliamentary Flag Group. In 2011, he was in more Parliamentary groups than any other MP.  As of January 2018, he is vice-chairman of All-Party United Nations Group and vice-chairman of All-Party Parliamentary Group (APPG) for Transport Safety. Through the Human Rights and CAFOD Groups he became and remained involved with the life, work and legacy of Óscar Romero since 1978. Through the Mental Health Groups he helped Charles Walker MP gain the first major debate on conditions lumped together as mental illness.

Bottomley has been a supporter of British pensioners living overseas, mainly in Commonwealth countries (47 out of 54) who have had their British state pensions frozen at the rates at which they were first paid or as at the dates of migration. British pensioners living in the remaining seven Commonwealth countries and those living in a number of non-Commonwealth countries have their British state pensions uprated each year, just as if they were living in the UK.

An advocate for reducing the voting age to 16, Bottomley is a co-founder and Vice Chair of the APPG on Votes at 16 and a supporter of the Votes at 16 campaign.

Before the 2016 referendum, Bottomley was in favour of the United Kingdom remaining in the European Union.

Bottomley is co-chair to the APPG on Haemophilia and Contaminated Blood and campaigns to get justice for those affected by the tainted blood scandal. During a debate in Parliament on 24 November 2016 he urged Prime Minister Theresa May to look at the issue.
After re-election in the 2019 general election he became the longest continuous-serving MP and thus Father of the House.

Personal life

In 1967 he married Virginia Garnett who later became a Cabinet Minister (Health Secretary), and a life peer in 2005 as Baroness Bottomley of Nettlestone.

His brother was a Labour Lambeth councillor; his brother-in-law was Conservative Mayor of Cambridge.  His niece is Kitty Ussher, the economist, former Labour MP and Minister. His great-grandfather Sir Richard Robinson led the Municipal Reformers to victory in the 1907 London County Council election.

In 1989 he successfully sued The Mail on Sunday, the Daily Express and News of the World for allegations connected with his support of the union membership of a social worker in his constituency accused of misbehaviour in a children's home. In 1995 he was awarded £40,000 against the Sunday Express for an article which accused him of betraying the paratrooper Private Lee Clegg, who was in jail for the murder of a joyrider in Northern Ireland, by appearing at a meeting with Martin McGuinness.

In 2002–2003 he was Master of the Worshipful Company of Drapers.

In November 2003 he was banned from driving for six months following several speeding offences. A newspaper organised an electric  bike for him.

Bottomley was knighted in the 2011 New Year Honours for public service.

References

Bibliography

 Who's Who 2008, A&C Black

External links

Peter Bottomley MP official constituency website
Profile at the Conservative Party
Worthing Conservatives

 

1944 births
Living people
People educated at Westminster School, London
Alumni of Trinity College, Cambridge
People from Newport, Shropshire
Conservative Party (UK) MPs for English constituencies
Spouses of life peers
UK MPs 1974–1979
UK MPs 1979–1983
UK MPs 1983–1987
UK MPs 1987–1992
UK MPs 1992–1997
UK MPs 1997–2001
UK MPs 2001–2005
UK MPs 2005–2010
UK MPs 2010–2015
UK MPs 2015–2017
UK MPs 2017–2019
UK MPs 2019–present
Knights Bachelor
Politicians awarded knighthoods
Northern Ireland Office junior ministers
British monarchists